Harishankar Brahma (born 19 April 1950) served as 19th Chief Election Commissioner of India. He is a retired I.A.S. officer of 1975 batch from the Andhra Pradesh cadre

Mr. Brahma, who retired as the Union Power Secretary in April 2010, held office till 18 April 2015. He is second person from the North-East to become an Election Commissioner, after J. M. Lyngdoh.

Early life and education
Born in a Bodo family in Gossaigaon, Kokrajhar district, Assam on 19 April 1950, he completed his post graduation in Political Science from Gauhati University and graduated from St. Edmund's College, Shillong. He did his schooling from Don Bosco School, Guwahati. He is a 1975 Indian Administrative Service officer belonging to the Andhra Pradesh cadre

Career
Harishankar Brahma has held various senior level posts in the Government of India and State Government prior to the present posting.  Before retiring as Secretary from the Ministry of Power, Shri Brahma held posts such as Joint Secretary (Border Management) for more than four years and completed almost all the border fencing and other border infrastructural work on Indo-Pak – Indo-Bangladesh border. He also worked as Special Secretary & Additional Secretary in National Disaster Management Authority (Ministry of Home Affairs). He was the Member-Secretary of the State Electricity Board, Andhra Pradesh and also worked as:
 District Collector & Magistrate for 4 years;
 Commissioner, Municipal Corporation of  Hyderabad for 3 and a half years;
 Commissioner (Transport) & Ex-officio Secretary (Transport, Road & Building), Government of Andhra Pradesh for 2 and a half years;
 Commissioner & Ex-officio Secretary (Food, Civil Supplies & Consumer Affairs) for 5 years; and
 Principal Secretary (Environment, Forest, Science & Technology), Government of Andhra Pradesh.
He was appointed as the election commissioner in August 2010. He has overseen two Lok Sabha elections and at least one round of Assembly elections in every state.

Views on 2012 Assam violence 

In an article in The Indian Express on 28 July 2012, he blamed illegal immigration from Bangladesh for the 2012 Assam violence. He mentioned that even Election Commission is faced with this problem by saying, "Even the Election Commission of India is not immune to this problem. It has to tackle the problem of D-Voters (doubtful voters), numbering approximately 1.5 lakh, while preparing the electoral rolls of Assam. The subject matter is sub-judice. This also poses a very serious security threat to the country. It is advisable that these pending cases lying in various courts and tribunals be disposed of quickly and within a definite timeframe. People who are found to be illegal migrants by these tribunals should be deported. Unless this basic issue of illegal migration into the country is resolved, the problem is bound to recur from time to time and in place to place."

References

1950 births
Living people
Chief Election Commissioners of India
Politicians from Guwahati
Don Bosco schools alumni
Bodo people